Juan José Fuertes Martínez (born 11 March 1976 in Pamplona, Navarra) is an S5 swimmer from Spain.  He has  cerebral palsy.  He competed at the 1992 winning a gold and silver medal in the freestyle and medley relay races respectively. He also competed at the 1996 Summer Paralympics winning a gold medal in the 50 meter freestyle and the 100 meter freestyle races, a silver medal in the 100 meter freestyle race and the 4 x 50 meter Freestyle relay 20 Points race and he also won a bronze medal  in the 4 x 50 meter medley relay 20 Points race.

References

External links 
 
 

1976 births
Living people
Sportspeople from Pamplona
Spanish male freestyle swimmers
Spanish male backstroke swimmers
Spanish male butterfly swimmers
Paralympic swimmers of Spain
Paralympic gold medalists for Spain
Paralympic silver medalists for Spain
Paralympic bronze medalists for Spain
Paralympic medalists in swimming
Swimmers at the 1992 Summer Paralympics
Swimmers at the 1996 Summer Paralympics
Medalists at the 1992 Summer Paralympics
Medalists at the 1996 Summer Paralympics
S5-classified Paralympic swimmers